The pi Puppids are a meteor shower associated with the comet 26P/Grigg-Skjellerup.

The meteor stream was viewable around April 23 but only in years around the parent comet's perihelion date, the last being in 2003. However, as the planet Jupiter has now perturbed the comet's perihelion to beyond Earth's orbit it is uncertain how strong the shower will be in the future.

The pi Puppids get their name because their radiant appears to lie in the constellation Puppis, at around Right ascension 112 degrees and Declination −45 degrees. This made them only visible to southern observers.

They were discovered in 1972 and have been observed about every 5 years - at each perihelion passage of the comet - but often at very low rates per hour.

External links 
 Observing and History of the Pi Puppids

April events
Meteor showers